Mandatory retirement also known as forced retirement, enforced retirement or compulsory retirement, is the set age at which people who hold certain jobs or offices are required by industry custom or by law to leave their employment, or retire.

As of 2017, as reported by the Organisation for Economic Co-operation and Development (OECD), only three European member states (UK, Denmark and Poland) and four OECD countries (Canada, Australia, New Zealand, United States) had laws banning mandatory retirement.

Rationale
Typically, mandatory retirement is justified by the argument that certain occupations are either too dangerous (military personnel) or require high levels of physical and mental skill (air traffic controllers, airline pilots). Most rely on the notion that a worker's productivity declines significantly after age 70, and the mandatory retirement is the employer's way to avoid reduced productivity. However, since the age at which retirement is mandated is often somewhat arbitrary and not based upon an actual physical evaluation of an individual person, many view the practice as a form of age discrimination, or ageism.

Economist Edward Lazear has argued that mandatory retirement can be an important tool for employers to construct wage contracts that prevent worker shirking. Employers can tilt the wage profile of a worker so that it is below marginal productivity early on and above marginal productivity toward the end of the employment relationship. In this way, the employer retains extra profits from the worker early on, which he returns in the later period if the worker has not shirked his duties or responsibilities in the first period (assuming a competitive market).

Countries

Australia 
In Australia, compulsory retirement is generally unlawful throughout the various State and Territory jurisdictions in Australia. Among exceptions to the general rule, permanent members of the Australian Defence Force must retire at the age of 60 and reservists at 65.

Since the passage of a constitutional amendment in 1977, judges on federal courts are required to retire at the age of 70.

Brazil
The Constitution of Brazil says in Article 40, Paragraph 1, Item II, that all public servants in the Union, States, Cities and the Federal District shall mandatorily retire at the age of 70. This regulation encompasses servants from the executive, legislative and judicial branches. It also applies to the Supreme Federal Court Justices, as per Article 93, Item VI, of the Constitution, and the Court of Accounts of the Union Judges, as stated in Article 73, Paragraph 3 of the Constitution (disposition added after the 20th Amendment).

Canada 
The normal age for retirement in Canada is 65, but one cannot be forced to retire at that age. Labour laws in the country do not specify a retirement age. Age 65 is when federal Old Age Security pension benefits begin, and most private and public retirement plans have been designed to provide income to the person starting at 65 (an age is needed to select premium payments by contributors to be able to calculate how much money is available to retirees when they leave the program by retiring).

All judges in Canada are subject to mandatory retirement, at 70 or 75 depending on the court. Federal senators cease to hold their seats at 75.

Israel
A 2006 decision by Israel's High Court of Justice stated that mandatory retirement at age 67 does not discriminate against the elderly.

New Zealand
In New Zealand, there is no mandatory retirement age except if working in a job that clearly specifies a mandatory retirement age. The normal age of retirement is the same as the beginning of pension payments, which is 65.

Philippines
Employees working in the government, who can retire as early as age 60, have a set mandatory retirement age of 65. Personnel including officials of the Philippine Armed Forces, the Philippine Coast Guard, the Philippine National Police, the Bureau of Fire Protection, and the Bureau of Jail Management and Penology are required to retire once they reach age 56. Judges are subject to mandatory retirement at 70.

In the private sector, it is illegal to force employees and executives in the private sector to be forced to retire before age 65 with the exception of underground miners who are required to retire at age 60, and professional racehorse jockeys at age 55.

South Korea 
South Korea enforces compulsory retirement before age 60 at the latest to all private companies, and 65 for public sectors. However, it is custom for most companies to lay off their employees between the ages of 50 to 55.

United Kingdom 
In October 2006 the Employment Equality (Age) Regulations 2006, the UK Labour Government introduced a Default Retirement Age, whereby employers are able to terminate or deny employment to people over 65 without a reason. A legal challenge to this failed in September 2009, although a review of the legislation was expected in 2010 by the new Conservative/Liberal Democrat coalition government. This review has taken place and on 17 February 2011 BIS published the draft Regulations abolishing the Default Retirement Age. Revised regulations were later implemented and, as of 6 April 2011, employers can no longer give employees notice of retirement under Default Retirement Age provisions and will need to objectively justify any compulsory retirement age still in place to avoid age discrimination claims.

United States 
Mandatory retirement is generally unlawful in the United States, except in certain industries and occupations that are regulated by law, and are often part of the government (such as military service and federal police agencies, such as the Federal Bureau of Investigation).

From the U.S. Equal Employment Opportunity Commission website:

From the U.S. Code of Federal Regulations discussing the Age Discrimination in Employment Act:

Professions
 Pilots: the mandatory retirement age of airline pilots is 65. The Fair Treatment for Experienced Pilots Act (Public Law 110-135) went into effect on 13 December 2007, raising the age to 65 from the previous 60.
 Air traffic controllers: Mandatory retirement age of 56, with exceptions up to age 61.
 Foreign Service employees at the Department of State: Mandatory retirement at 65 with very narrow exceptions.
 Federal law enforcement officers, national park rangers and firefighters: Mandatory retirement age of 57, or later if less than 20 years of service.
 Florida Supreme Court justices: The Florida Constitution establishes mandatory retirement at age 70.
 Michigan Judges of all levels cannot run for election after passing the age of 70.
 Minnesota has statutorily established mandatory retirement for all judges at age 70 (more precisely, at the end of the month a judge reaches that age). The Minnesota Legislature has had the constitutional right to set judicial retirement ages since 1956, but did not do so until 1973, setting the age at 70.
 New Hampshire Constitution - Article 78 sets the retirement of all Judges and sheriffs at age 70.
 New Jersey Supreme Court also established mandatory retirement at age 70.
 Maryland Constitution establishes mandatory retirement age of 70 for Circuit and Appellate Court judges.
 Oregon – mandatory judicial retirement age of 75.

United Nations
 The United Nations has a mandatory retirement age of 65.

Religions

Roman Catholic Church 

There is no mandatory retirement age for cardinals nor for the pope, as they hold these positions for life, but cardinals age 80 or over are prohibited from participating in the papal conclave as of 1970 because of the Ingravescentem aetatem. The Code of Canon Law specifies in Canon 401 that ordinary bishops, nuncios, and bishops with Curial appointments (but not auxiliary bishops) must present their resignation to the Pope when they turn 75, but he need not accept it right away or at all. Canon 538 makes a similar stipulation of diocesan priests who must offer to resign from their appointments at 75. Note that in either case, resigning from the active exercise of the office means giving up the daily responsibilities of the offices, not ordination itself. Once a man is ordained a priest or a bishop, he retains that character until his death, whether he is still working or has since retired.

See also 
 Pension
 Retirement
 Retirement age
 Up or out

References

Age and society
Retirement